Old Moshi Magharibi is a town and ward in the Moshi Rural district of the Kilimanjaro Region of Tanzania. Its population according to the 2012 census was 8,100.

References

Wards of Kilimanjaro Region